Silas Adams (February 9, 1839 – May 5, 1896) was an American attorney and politician from Kentucky who served for one term as a member of the United States House of Representatives from Kentucky's 11th congressional district.

Early life and education
He was born in Pulaski County, Kentucky, on February 9, 1839, and moved to Casey County with his parents in 1841. He attended Kentucky University (now Transylvania University).

Career
He entered the Union Army during the Civil War as a first lieutenant in the 1st Kentucky Cavalry Regiment. He was later promoted to captain, lieutenant colonel and colonel of the regiment. He was mustered out on December 31, 1864.

His experiences in the cavalry are recorded in the book The Wild Riders of the First Kentucky Cavalry by Eastham Tarrant.

Following the war, he entered the Lexington Law School in 1867. He was later admitted to the bar and practiced law.

He served two terms as county attorney and later was a member of the Kentucky House of Representatives from 1889 to 1892. He led an unsuccessful campaign as a Republican candidate for the United States Senate in 1892. He was later elected as a Republican to the 53rd U.S. Congress (March 4, 1893 – March 3, 1895). He was an unsuccessful independent candidate for re-election in 1894 to the 54th U.S. Congress and thereafter returned to the practice of law.

Personal life 
He died in Liberty on May 5, 1896, and was buried in Brown Cemetery in Casey County.

References

Biographical Directory of the United States Congress, 1771–Present
Who Was Who in America: Historical Volume 1607-1896. Chicago: Marquis Who's Who, 1963.

1839 births
1896 deaths
People from Pulaski County, Kentucky
Republican Party members of the United States House of Representatives from Kentucky
Republican Party members of the Kentucky House of Representatives
People from Casey County, Kentucky
19th-century American politicians
Transylvania University alumni
Union Army colonels
People of Kentucky in the American Civil War